2-Ethylhexyl glycidyl ether is a liquid organic molecule with formula C11H22O2 an industrial chemical used to reduce the viscosity of epoxy resins. These are then used in adhesives, sealants, and paints or coatings. It has the CAS Registry Number of 2461-15-6. It has the IUPAC name of 2-(2-ethylhexoxymethyl)oxirane. It also finds use in other polymer based applications.

Synthesis
2-Ethylhexanol and epichlorohydrin are reacted in the presence of a Lewis acid catalyst in a condensation reaction to form a halohydrin. This is followed by a caustic dehydrochlorination, to form 2-ethylhexyl glycidyl ether. The waste products are water and sodium chloride and excess caustic soda. One of the quality control tests would involve measuring the Epoxy value by determination of the epoxy equivalent weight.

Commercial
The material is produced domestically in the United States and is also produced in other parts of the world. Over 13 million kg were exported from China in 2019.

Uses
As an Epoxy modifier it is classed as an epoxy Reactive diluent. As well as being used as an epoxy resin diluent, it maybe further reacted to produce cosmetics. It is also used to synthesize other molecules. The use of the diluent does effect mechanical properties and microstructure of epoxy resins.

Safety
The safety of the product is fairly well understood. It is classed as a skin sensitizer.

See also
 Epoxide
 Glycidol

References

Further reading

External Websites
 Sachem Glycidyl Ethers
  Cameo Chemicals
 Hexion website
 Miller-Stephenson Diluents

Glycidyl ethers
Reactive diluents